Dobryansky district (Russian: Добрянский район) was an administrative district of Perm Krai, Russia. Its centre is the town of Dobryanka. Its area is 5,192 km2, 70% of which covered by forest. Main minerals are oil, gypsum and gravel.

Population  
The district's population is 64,400 (2002 census). Ethnically, 91.5% are Russians; 2.5% are Tatars; 1.2% are Komi-Permyaks and 4.8% are others. Most of the population live in Dobryanka (59.8%) and Polazna (19.8%).

See also
Zakharovtsy
Zalesnaya
Zavozhik
Zaborye

References

External links  
Official website of district
Website of town Dobryanka

Districts of Perm Krai